Conus royaikeni is a species of sea snail, a marine gastropod mollusc in the family Conidae, the cone snails, cone shells or cones.

These snails are predatory and venomous. They are capable of "stinging" humans.

Description
The size of the shell attains 51 mm.

Distribution
This marine species occurs off KwaZulu-Natal, South Africa

References

 Veldsman S.G. (2010) A new species of Dendroconus from KwaZulu-Natal, South Africa. Malacologia Mostra Mondiale 66: 3-10.
 Puillandre N., Duda T.F., Meyer C., Olivera B.M. & Bouchet P. (2015). One, four or 100 genera? A new classification of the cone snails. Journal of Molluscan Studies. 81: 1-23

External links
 To World Register of Marine Species
 

royaikeni
Gastropods described in 2010